Jatropha nudicaulis is a species of plant in the family Euphorbiaceae. It is endemic to Ecuador.  Its natural habitat is subtropical or tropical dry shrubland.

References

nudicaulis
Endemic flora of Ecuador
Endangered plants
Taxonomy articles created by Polbot